{{DISPLAYTITLE:Cav2.1}}

Cav2.1, also called the P/Q voltage-dependent calcium channel, is a calcium channel found mainly in the brain. Specifically, it is found on the presynaptic terminals of neurons in the brain and cerebellum. Cav2.1 plays an important role in controlling the release of neurotransmitters between neurons. It is composed of multiple subunits, including alpha-1, beta, alpha-2/delta, and gamma subunits. The alpha-1 subunit is the pore-forming subunit, meaning that the calcium ions flow through it. Different kinds of calcium channels have different isoforms (versions) of the alpha-1 subunit. Cav2.1 has the alpha-1A subunit, which is encoded by the CACNA1A gene. Mutations in CACNA1A  have been associated with various neurologic disorders, including familial hemiplegic migraine, episodic ataxia type 2, and spinocerebellar ataxia type 6.

Function 

"Voltage-dependent calcium channels mediate the entry of calcium ions into excitable cells, and are also involved in a variety of calcium-dependent processes, including muscle contraction, hormone or neurotransmitter release, and gene expression. Calcium channels are multisubunit complexes composed of alpha-1, beta, alpha-2/delta, and gamma subunits. The channel activity is directed by the pore-forming alpha-1 subunit, whereas, the others act as auxiliary subunits regulating this activity. The distinctive properties of the calcium channel types are related primarily to the expression of a variety of alpha-1 isoforms, alpha-1A, B, C, D, E, and S. This gene encodes the alpha-1A subunit, which is predominantly expressed in neuronal tissue."

Clinical significance 

Mutations in the CACNA1A gene are associated with multiple neurologic disorders, many of which are episodic, such as familial hemiplegic migraine, movement disorders such as episodic ataxia, and epilepsy with multiple seizure types.

"This gene also exhibits polymorphic variation due to (CAG)n-repeats. Multiple transcript variants encoding different isoforms have been found for this gene. In one set of transcript variants, the (CAG)n-repeats occur in the 3' UTR, and are not associated with any disease. However, in another set of variants, an insertion extends the coding region to include the (CAG)n-repeats which encode a polyglutamine tract. Expansion of the (CAG)n-repeats from the normal 4-16 to 21-28 in the coding region is associated with spinocerebellar ataxia 6."

Interactions 

Cav2.1 has been shown to interact with CACNB4.

Notes

References

Further reading

Further reading 

 
  In 
  In 

 

Ion channels